Cham Rud (also Romanized as Cham Rūd; also known as Cham) is a village in Sohr va Firuzan Rural District, Pir Bakran District, Falavarjan County, Isfahan Province, Iran. At the 2006 census, its population was 603, in 167 families.

References 

Populated places in Falavarjan County